Human Targets is a 1932 American pre-Code Western film directed by J.P. McGowan and starring Buzz Barton and Francis X. Bushman Jr.

Cast
 Buzz Barton as Buzz Dale 
 Pauline Parker as Nellie Dale 
 Francis X. Bushman Jr. as Bart Travis 
 Edmund Cobb as Duke Remsden 
 Franklyn Farnum as Sheriff 
 Ted Adams as Deputy 
 Nanci Price as Marjorie 
 John Ince as Doctor 
 Fred Toones as 'Snowflake'

Plot
Buzz Dale's heroic rescue of a runaway stagecoach thwarts criminal Remsden's plan to rob the stage, framing Travis in the process. Remsden tries again, but Dale alerts the sheriff, rescuing Travis from a possible lynching.

References

Bibliography
 Michael R. Pitts. Poverty Row Studios, 1929–1940: An Illustrated History of 55 Independent Film Companies, with a Filmography for Each. McFarland & Company, 2005.

External links
 

1932 films
1932 Western (genre) films
American Western (genre) films
Films directed by J. P. McGowan
1930s English-language films
1930s American films